The 2014 Judo Grand Prix Zagreb was held in Zagreb, Croatia from 12 to 14 September 2014.

Medal summary

Men's events

Women's events

Source Results

Medal table

References

External links
 

2014 IJF World Tour
2014 Judo Grand Prix
Grand Prix 2014
Judo
Judo
Judo
Judo